700 Eleventh Street is a high-rise building, and is the second tallest commercial building in Washington, D.C.
The building is a twin building to Metro Center I, which is one block away. It is currently the 6th-tallest building in Washington, D.C. The architectural firm who designed the building was the firms Skidmore, Owings & Merrill (New York), Melvin Mitchell Architects.

See also
List of tallest buildings in Washington, D.C.

References

External links

Office buildings completed in 1992
Skyscraper office buildings in Washington, D.C.
1992 establishments in Washington, D.C.